The MRT Purple line or MRT Chalong Ratchatham line is Bangkok's fifth rapid transit line, following the Sukhumvit Line, Silom Line, MRT Blue Line, and Airport Rail Link. Daily ridership is 70,000. The line was opened on 6 August 2016 and is the second line of MRT system operated by BEM.

History

Origin 
Officially named the Chalong Ratchadham Line – "To Celebrate the Great King's Reign with Righteousness" – but informally known as the "Purple Line", the rapid transit system serves a north–south corridor in Bangkok's Mass Rapid Transit Master Plan. It incorporates an extension of the Blue Line from nearby Bang Sue station to Tao Poon station.

The construction project was divided into six contracts, three of them civil work. The contracts were signed from late 2009 to early 2010 and completion was originally scheduled for 2014. The third contract included construction of four park and ride buildings at the Khlong Bang Phai, Sam Yaek Bang Yai, Bang Rak Noi Tha It, and Yaek Nonthaburi 1 stations. On 31 March 2017, the fifth contract was effectively terminated and became part of a new Blue Line concession agreement.

The 2011 Thailand floods delayed the construction of the line, and in June 2013, five people were injured when six beams fell onto vehicles below Tao Poon station. In July 2014, the civil work was 94 percent complete; in October 2014, civil work was stated to be 99% complete.

The line was opened on 6 August 2016. However, the Blue Line extension section was delayed, so when it opened the Purple Line wasn't connect to any other rapid transit system in Bangkok. This resulted in low line usage. Even with a reduced fare, the line only attracted about 22,000 passengers daily compared to a goal of 100,000.

The Blue Line extension to Tao Poon was opened about a year later, on 11 August 2017, and ridership increased. In 2019, daily ridership for the line was 70,000.

Route

The Purple line starts from Khlong Bang Phai station in Bang Bua Thong District. Line travel south along Kanchanaphisek Road before turning eastward near Central Westgate, onto Rattanathibet Road. Line then continue along Rattanathibet Road, passing through a large residential area in Bang Yai District, crosses the Chao Phraya River on a bridge parallel to the Phra Nangklao Bridge and runs to Nonthaburi Civic Center station. Line then turn southward onto Tiwanon Road, passing Ministry of Public Health and turn southeast onto Krung Thep-Nonthaburi road, entering Yaek Tiwanon station. Line then entering Bangkok city limit at Bang Sue district. Passing Bang Son station before terminate at upper platform of Tao Poon station.

Bangkok's Mass Rapid Transit Master Plan includes extending Purple Line south from Tao Poon to Rat Burana through Bangkok's old town via both an underground and elevated route.

Approval was expected in mid 2017 with a tender due in the second half of 2017. On 25 July 2017, Cabinet approval was given, but the tender was then delayed until 2018. By December 2018, a tender had still not been issued and was further delayed. In August 2019, subject to final land acquisition, a March 2020 tender was planned. In mid 2020, the Ministry of Transport still aimed for a tendering process within 2020 despite COVID-19 related delays. The MRTA expected the tender to be issued in February 2021. If construction commences in the second half of 2021, the extension is projected to enter service in 2027. 

Construction contracts were finally signed in March 2022 for a planned 2027 opening date. Construction is in progress, with civil work 3.45% complete as of September 2022.

Stations

Rolling stock
In November 2013, BEM contracted with Marubeni Corp, Toshiba Corp, and East Japan Railway Company to install E&S systems, supply 21 three-car trains (total of 63 cars) rolling stock, and provide maintenance for 10 years as part of a contract worth 12.6 billion baht. East Japan Railway train manufacturing subsidiary J-TREC built them in Yokohama with the first sets delivered in early 2016.

In total, line is service by 21 three-car trains.

Operation
The 16-station Purple line runs from Khlong Bang Phai to Tao Poon and has a carrying capacity of 30,000 people in each direction per hour. Line operated everyday from 6am to midnight with headway of under 6 minutes during rush hour and 9 minutes during non-rush hour. All stations on the line are equipped with platform screen doors. Stations are built to accommodate six-car trains, but only three-car trains were used. The line has 1 depot near Khlong Bang Phai station

The MRTA has proposed to BEM to introduce multi-trip package fares to reduce prices which follows an earlier proposal by the Department of Railways to offer 40% discounts during off peak travel.

Ridership
When the Purple line first opened daily ridership was only 22,000 compared to projected numbers of 100,000. After the opening of the Blue Line extension to Tao Poon 1 year later in August 2017, daily average ridership increased significantly from 33,000 to 50,000.

In August 2018, the MRTA Deputy Governor stated that daily ridership had increased to 60,000 each weekday. By late 2019, this had increased to 70,000.

See also
 Mass Rapid Transit Master Plan in Bangkok Metropolitan Region
 BTS Skytrain
 Sukhumvit Line
 Silom Line
 Airport Rail Link (Bangkok)
 Bangkok Metro
 MRT Blue Line
 MRT Brown Line
 MRT Grey Line
 MRT Light Blue Line
 MRT Orange Line
 MRT Pink Line
 MRT Yellow Line
 SRT Dark Red Line
 SRT Light Red Line
 Bangkok BRT
 BMA Gold Line

References

External links

 "BEM Purple Line website"
"MRTA Purple Line South Extension website"
 Airport Rail Link, BTS, MRT & BRT network map

2016 establishments in Thailand
Purple line
Proposed public transport in Thailand
Nonthaburi province
Railway lines opened in 2016